The Shoreditch and Finsbury by-election 1958 was a parliamentary by-election for the Shoreditch and Finsbury constituency held on 27 November 1958.

The by-election was held following the conferment of a life peerage for Victor Collins.

It was a Labour hold. Until the 1999 Leeds Central by-election, the turnout was the lowest in post-war history.

Result

Previous result

References 

United Kingdom elections, 1955

Shoreditch and Finsbury by-election
Shoreditch and Finsbury by-election
Shoreditch and Finsbury by-election
Shoreditch
Shoreditch and Finsbury,1958
Shoreditch and Finsbury,1958